REFUNITE (Refugees United) is a non-profit organization established by David and Christopher Mikkelsen, with the stated mission to "help refugees and internally displaced persons (IDPs) search for their missing loved ones." It focuses on online and mobile solutions to help families reconnect. 

Families can search for their missing loved ones by registering onto REFUNITE's family tracing platform. The REFUNITE family reconnection platform allows users to register, search for, and message their missing loved ones that have also signed up on the platform.

REFUNITE works through partnerships with like-minded individuals, organizations, corporations, and humanitarian agencies. Its headquarters are located in Copenhagen, Denmark, with the main technology development lab and operations being based out of Kampala, Uganda.

History
REFUNITE was founded in 2008 by two Danish brothers, David and Christopher Mikkelsen, after their personal journey trying to reconnect a young Afghan refugee with his family. In their search, the two brothers discovered that existing family tracing programs lacked cross-border, collaborative technology, and that the process of family tracing was also often tied to cumbersome procedures and paperwork.

This prompted David and Christopher to develop a global, centralized, and free platform that would allow refugees and other Internally Displaced Persons (IDPs) to search and reconnect with their missing family and loved ones. REFUNITE empowers refugees and separated families to search, connect, and communicate with family and friends they have lost along the way. The organization provides the family reconnection service, but puts it in the hands of its users to conduct the actual search, thus democratizing access to family tracing.

Out of the 68 million forcibly displaced people worldwide, many do not have access to Internet and have very basic and simple mobile phones. REFUNITE focuses on making their service available to as many users as possible and through various touch points, from the very low-end, basic technology to the more sophisticated one.

Together with Ericsson, REFUNITE has partnered with a global coalition of mobile network operators. Through these partnerships, the organization is able to communicate directly with millions of forcibly displaced people through SMS and make access to the platform free of charge. So far, over 1 million people have registered on the REFUNITE platform.

REFUNITE's technology

Web 
The family reconnection platform can be accessed through the official website. The search tool is available in twelve languages, including English, Swahili, Somali, Arabic, French, Congolese Swahili, Hindi, Urdu, Pashto, Kurdish, Dari, and Tagalog. The website can be accessed by anyone with an Internet connection.

Outreach volunteers 

 REFUNITE works with outreach volunteers in Kakuma refugee camp in Kenya. The organization has teamed up with UNHCR as well as other aid organizations operating in camps in order to train local refugees on REFUNITE’s technology, so these refugees can help others sign up. Many of the outreach volunteers, who are refugees themselves, are still looking for their own families as well, and are helping others while waiting to be reconnected. They walk around the camps promoting REFUNITE’s service and help anyone interested to register and search. They are some of the most important people to REFUNITE, as they are instrumental in advocating the service and help foster trust between the organization and its beneficiaries in the camps.

Awards 

 2017 Social Entrepreneurs of The Year: World Economic Forum, Schwab Foundation for Social Entrepreneurship
 2016 25 Most Daring: Condé Nast, Vanity Fair and WIRED 
 2013 Prix Ars Electronica: Award of Distinction in the category Digital Communities
 2013 Lovie Award: Lost and Found - The Story of Refugees United
 2012 Webby Award Winner: Lost and Found - The Story of Refugees United
2011 PopTech: Social Innovation Fellows
2008 3 Mobile Pioneer Award

Partners

Corporate partners 
REFUNITE’s corporate partners include, among others, mobile network operators that enable the organization to communicate directly with refugees and send text messages to their phones. REFUNITE’s partners are:
 Ericsson
 Facebook 
 Safaricom in Kenya
 Vodacom DRC in the Democratic Republic of the Congo
 Telesom in Somaliland
 Avea in Turkey
 Asiacell in Iraq
 Zain Group in Jordan and South Sudan

Read about REFUNITE's global partnerships here: https://refunite.org/partners/

Humanitarian partners 
REFUNITE has partnered with a number of humanitarian organizations including the International Rescue Committee (IRC)  and the UN Refugee Agency (UNHCR).

Funders 
REFUNITE's main funders include the H&M Foundation, the Swedish Postkod Foundation and the IKEA Foundation. They have also been funded by Omidyar Network, Maersk Foundation, Danfoss Foundation, LEGO Foundation, SAP and many others.

References

External links
 

Refugee aid organizations